Raw Reality With Gail Kasper is a late-night television program airing on WMCN. Each week, American actress and host Gail Kasper pokes fun at a life topic and the Odd Squad, two comedians, support her efforts along with an expert. The program ends with Pass or Fail with Gail, where a viewer's real-life situation is shared with the Odd Squad, and they must grade the viewer's response with a pass or fail.

References

https://www.imdb.com/title/tt3058732/
http://thenewwmcn.com/all-shows/
http://justaddlobster.com/getmainelobster-coms-ceo-to-be-featured-on-raw-reality-with-gail-kasper-on-september-4/

External links
 http://www.rawrealitywithgailkasper.com
 http://gailkasper.com

American late-night television shows